The Kodak Retina Reflex is a discontinued series of four single-lens reflex cameras made by Kodak in Germany between 1957 and 1974, as part of the Kodak Retina line of 35mm film cameras.

Overview
The earliest Retina Reflex (Type 025, 1957) uses the convertible lens system introduced with the Kodak Retina IIc/IIIc in 1954. The successor cameras, starting with the Retina Reflex S (Type 034, 1959), use DKL-mount lenses, introduced with the Retina IIIS of 1958. The Retina Reflex brand was discontinued in 1966, then revived as the Instamatic Reflex in 1968, using the same DKL-mount lenses with the easy-loading Kodapak line of 126 film cartridges. The Instamatic Reflex was discontinued in 1974.

Convertible lens camera

Retina Reflex

The Kodak Type 025 Retina Reflex is an SLR camera that uses convertible lenses (German: Wechselobjektiv), made by Kodak AG Stuttgart, Germany. It was made between Spring 1957 and October 1958. Like many 35 mm SLR cameras of West German heritage it is equipped with a leaf shutter instead of a focal plane shutter. It was named Type 025 Retina Reflex since it inherited several features from the contemporary Retina rangefinder cameras, like the Retina IIIc: The film advance and exposure counting system, the film channel, the selenium meter, and the focusing mechanics of the lenses. Even the Synchro-Compur shutter is very similar to the earlier designs.

The convertible lenses of early Retina reflex models are equipped with interchangeable front elements and a fixed set of elements that remain on the body.  Later models had fully interchangeable lenses.  In these first models, the front three elements are contained in a cell that bayonets into the front of the lens assembly. The standard front cell can be replaced with one of three Schneider components - an 80mm and two different 35mm components. The rear part of the lens (which is a permanent part of the camera body) contains the focusing apparatus, the entire Synchro-Compur shutter, the aperture, and the three rear elements, which are common to all 4 lenses. This interchangeable front component concept was introduced in 1954 with the folding Retina IIc and IIIc models. Care must be exercised when using front components other than the standard (50mm) one, as it is possible to set the body mounted aperture wider than the maximum aperture of the lens (i.e. f/2 instead of f/4 or f/5.6).

A similar system was introduced in 1953 with the Contaflex (SLR). The Retina Reflex is, on rare occasions, found with very similar lenses made by Rodenstock. As the Rodenstock front components are not compatible with the Schneider rear component (and vice versa), minor changes were made to the bayonet mount for each manufacturer.  These interchangeable Retina lens components can also be used on the Retina IIc, IIC, IIIc, and IIIC rangefinder cameras.

The camera offers the convenience of image composition with wide open aperture. The aperture is stopped down to  the selected value after the shutter is released. After exposure the mirror stays up until the bottom-mounted single-stroke film advance lever is again wound. Focusing is via  a ground glass screen with a central split-image rangefinder.

The camera's top plate has the manually set frame counter, the shutter release, the film rewind knob with film reminder dial, the exposure needle window, meter adjustment knob with EV and ASA/DIN scales, the film (advance) release button, the frame (counter) advance slider, and the accessory shoe. The bottom plate contains the tripod socket, the film advance lever, the back release latch, and the film rewind release button.

In use, the Retina Reflex frame counter works down from 35 (or 20) to 0, at which point the film advance locks. While this is convenient for the user and does prevent torn film sprockets at the end of a roll, setting the counter up properly at the beginning of a roll is complex, awkward, and time-consuming.  This is a typical example of much of Retina engineering - complex and ingenious, but perhaps over-done.

The non-coupled selenium cell exposure meter reads out in exposure values (EVs) only. The camera is then set to the proper EV setting via an easily reached aperture release tab, though the EV scale itself is rather inconveniently located on the underside of the lens assembly. Once the aperture release tab is set and released, the shutter ring is coupled to the aperture ring - moving the shutter ring automatically moves the aperture ring, so that the same exposure value is maintained. In other words, when in use, the camera is normally locked into one EV setting until the aperture release tab is pressed. Needless to say this can be confusing to those unfamiliar with the camera.

All the Retina Reflex cameras are remarkably complex instruments and quite heavy for their size. Approximately 65,000 were made.

Lenses for the Retina Reflex
The standard Retina-Xenon lens is a 50 mm lens with a different maximum aperture, depending on the camera. The Retina Reflex was equipped with either a Schneider-Kreuznach Retina-Xenon or a Rodenstock Retina-Heligon, both . For each camera, the standard lens is a six-element, four-group Double-Gauss lens split into two parts: a set of three front elements that can be removed and a permanently-fixed set of three rear elements, set behind the aperture and shutter.

In the Retina convertible lens system, which is used with the Retina Reflex and earlier Retina IIc, IIC, IIIc, and IIIC rangefinder cameras, the same set of three permanently-fixed rear elements are shared with the standard lens and the user exchanges the front set of lens elements to modify the focal length. For the Retina Reflex, the wide-angle 35 mm  unit could be fitted, but this combination was not recommended as the resulting image on the ground glass screen would be dim and hard to focus. There are six distinct front lens units in total from the two manufacturers; each of the wide-angle and telephoto front lens units include six elements in four groups.

Users were cautioned to stay with the same manufacturer for the front conversion lens units: that is, cameras originally equipped with the Schneider-Kreuznach Retina-Xenon are intended to be used with the Retina-Curtar-Xenon or Retina-Longar-Xenon front lens units exclusively, while those originally equipped with the Rodenstock Retina-Heligon were advised to use Retina-Heligon wide-angle and telephoto front lens units. In addition, the front and rear standard lens units were matched, and the serial number on the lens should match the serial number engraved inside the outer bayonet ring.

Interchangeable (DKL-mount) lens cameras

Retina Reflex S

Introduced in 1959, the Type 034 Retina Reflex S was a major redesign of the original Retina Reflex. The major difference is its use of fully interchangeable lenses, the same lenses that were made for the Kodak Retina IIIS rangefinder camera.  The lens mount is commonly referred to as the Deckel mount, after the manufacturer of Compur leaf shutters. This same mount, with minor differences, was also used by a number of other German camera makers, including Braun and Voigtländer. It was also used in the later Retina Reflex III, Retina Reflex IV, and the Kodak Instamatic Reflex. As for the original Retina Reflex, lenses were available from both Schneider and Rodenstock, but this time the lenses had identical bayonet mounts.

The shutter is a Synchro-Compur behind the lens unit, which is part of the camera body. The aperture is now in the interchangeable lenses, which eliminates the problem of setting the wrong aperture on the original Retina Reflex.  Speed are from 1 sec. to 1/500th plus bulb.  It features M and X syncs and a self-timer.

What was the meter adjustment knob on the top plate is now a fixed housing for the ASA/DIN scale. The selenium cell exposure meter is now coupled to a "setting wheel" located on the very bottom of the lens mount. This setting wheel sets adjusts the camera's exposure value (EV) by changing (in a most complex fashion) the aperture and/or shutter rings at the same time that it changes the depth-of-field pointers on the camera's lens.   When another button (located on the top plate) is pushed simultaneously, the setting wheel is also used to set the exposure meter's ASA/DIN setting.

The top plate, bottom plate, and camera body are otherwise nearly identical to the Retina Reflex. 
 
Approximately 78,000 were made.

Retina Reflex III

A later variant is the Type 041 Retina Reflex III. It was made from 1960 to 1964.

Its match-needle meter instrument scale is visible in the viewfinder as well as on the top plate. The camera was originally equipped with the same coupled selenium meter as the Reflex S, but after 1962 a larger one was fitted, again made by Gossen. The Reflex III features the same "setting wheel" and interlocking aperture/shutter rings as the Reflex S.  As it was fashion in the early 1960s the shutter release button on top was replaced by a shutter release shifter beside the lens mount. The film advance release button was eliminated, that function being incorporated in the frame reset slider, which was moved to the bottom plate along with the (still) manually reset frame counter. The ASA setting button was moved from the ASA dial to the spot vacated by the release button.

This redesign made a new camera case design necessary, leaving additional space for the frame counter, and the frame reset slider. The Retina Reflex cases were already something special before since the film advance lever (Reflex) and aperture/shutter setting wheel (Reflex S) are located on the bottom. The photo shows just how complex the Retina case had become.

The Reflex III has the same aperture/shutter setting wheel (which Kodak called simply the "setting wheel") and interlocking aperture/shutter rings as the Reflex S.

Approximately 116,000 were made.

Retina Reflex IV

The Type 051 Retina Reflex IV was made from 1964 to 1967. It has a characteristic little window in the front of its pentaprism housing, which displays the aperture in use in the viewfinder. The accessory shoe now had flash contacts. The frame counter now automatically resets to 36 when the back is opened; the frame advance slider is used to set the counter for shorter rolls. The split-image rangefinder on the ground glass is now at a 45 degree angle.

Over 524,000 were made.

Instamatic Reflex

Two PX825 button cell batteries are used to power the  exposure meter, flashcubes, and shutter speed control; without batteries, the  second shutter speed was still available. For the Xenar 45 mm lens included with most kits, the aperture could be linked to the focus to provide the correct exposure when using flashcubes.

Lenses for Retina Reflex S, III, IV, Instamatic Reflex, and Retina IIIS

Notes

List of Schneider-Kreuznach Retina DKL-mount lenses:

Schneider-Kreuznach Retina-Curtagon 28mm f/4
Schneider-Kreuznach Curtagon 28mm f/4 (for Instamatic Reflex)
Schneider-Kreuznach Retina-Curtagon 35mm f/2.8
Schneider-Kreuznach Curtagon 35mm f/2.8 (for Instamatic Reflex) 
Schneider-Kreuznach Retina-Xenar 45mm f/2.8 (for Instamatic Reflex, can be used with Retina Reflex S, III, IV, but not with the Retina IIIS)
Schneider-Kreuznach Retina-Xenar 50mm f/2.8
Schneider-Kreuznach Retina-Xenon 50mm f/1.9
Schneider-Kreuznach Xenon 50mm f/1.9 (for Instamatic Reflex)
Schneider-Kreuznach Retina-Tele-Arton 85mm f/4
Schneider-Kreuznach Retina-Tele-Arton 90mm f/4 (for Instamatic Reflex)
Schneider-Kreuznach Retina-Tele-Xenar 135mm f/4
Schneider-Kreuznach Retina-Tele-Xenar 200mm f/4.8 (does not have the rangefinder cam necessary for focussing through viewfinder with the Retina IIIS)

List of Rodenstock Retina DKL-mount lenses:

Rodenstock Retina-Eurygon 30mm f/2.8
Rodenstock Retina-Eurygon 35mm f/4
Rodenstock Retina-Ysarex 50mm f/2.8
Rodenstock Retina-Heligon (and Retina-Ysarex???) 50mm f/1.9
Rodenstock Retina-Rotelar 85mm f/4
Rodenstock Retina-Rotelar 135mm f/4

List of third-party Retina DKL-mount lenses:

Univer-sar Tele Photo 135mm f/4
Bittco Super Vemar 135mm f/4
Vemar Telephoto 200mm f/4.8
Vemar Telephoto 135mm f/2.8

References

Sources
 Brian Coe, Kodak Cameras - The First Hundred Years,  Hove Foto Books, 1988
 
 Original Kodak user manuals for the Retina Reflex, Retina Reflex S, and Retina Reflex IV

External links

Retina Reflex III, Retina Reflex and Retina Reflex s at Sylvain Halgand's Collection-appareils.fr
German article in Schneider-Kreuznach archive
 Retina Reflex section at Retrography.com  by Simon Simonsen, Denmark
 Retina Reflex III and IV at Westford.com 
 Retina Reflex at "Photoethnography" 
 insight into a Retina Reflex of 1958 at "Innovative cameras"

Kodak SLR cameras